Xenophora mekranensis is a species of large sea snail, a marine gastropod mollusk in the family Xenophoridae, the carrier shells.

Description

Distribution

References

External links

Xenophoridae
Gastropods described in 1905